Transend Networks Pty Ltd was a Tasmanian government-owned business which operated between 1998 and 2014 as the electricity transmission network provider for Tasmania, Australia. It was formed by the disaggregation of the Hydro-Electric Commission, and ceased operation when it was merged on 1 July 2014 with the distribution division of Aurora Energy to form the combined network business TasNetworks.

Transend transmitted electricity from power stations in Tasmania and on mainland Australia (via Basslink) to its customers around the state. Transend's customers included electricity generators, electricity retailers and major industrial customers.

Transend was a participant in Australia's National Electricity Market (NEM). The NEM operates on an interconnected power system that extends from Queensland to South Australia. Tasmania is connected to the NEM via Basslink. Transend was a regulated monopoly that received its revenue cap from the Australian Energy Regulator.

Transend also owned and operated a telecommunications business that served customers in the electricity supply industry and in other industries.

References

External links
 Tasmanian Electricity Reform website

Companies based in Tasmania
Companies established in 1998
Companies disestablished in 2014
Defunct utility companies of Australia
Defunct government-owned companies of Tasmania
Electric power monopolies
Australian companies established in 1998
Energy companies established in 1998
Australian companies disestablished in 2014
Energy companies disestablished in 2014
Defunct electric power companies of Australia